The University of Laghouat or Amar Telidji University of Laghouat (Arabic: جامعة عمار ثليجي, French: Université Amar Telidji Laghouat) is a university in the city of Laghouat, the capital city of Laghouat Province in Algeria. It was established in 1986 and given full university status in 2001.

The university is named after Ali Thaleji, called "Amar", who served in the signal corps of the National Liberation Army during the Algerian War.

History
Before becoming a national university, the university passed through several stages. University education in Laghouat began under Executive Decree No. 86-165 of August 05, 1986, which ordered the establishment of the Higher School for Technical Education Teachers.  The number of students for the 1986–7 academic year was 314 under the supervision of 23 professors.

Under Decree No. 97-157 of 10 May 1997, the Higher School for Technical Education Teachers was changed into a university center.  The center included four departments: electrical engineering, mechanical engineering, civil engineering, and economics. 

In 1995, the university began offering postgraduate studies in materials science. Other departments were established including industrial chemistry in 1997, informatics, law, and management in 1998, and biology in 2000.

Under Executive Decree No. 01-270 of September 19, 2001, the university was officially recognized as a national university.

External links 
 
 Université Amar Telidji de Laghouat

References 

Educational institutions established in 1986
Buildings and structures in Laghouat Province
Laghouat
1986 establishments in Algeria